Babamunida debrae is a species of squat lobster in the family Munididae. It was discovered on the west coast of Hawaii, usually sheltering in holes of lava rocks.

References

Squat lobsters
Crustaceans described in 2011
Crustaceans of Hawaii